Walter Reid may refer to:

 Walter Reid (footballer) (born 1869), Scottish footballer at Grimsby Town
 Walter Scott Reid, New Zealand's first Solicitor General, 1875–1900
 Walter Reid (abbot), the last Cistercian Abbot of Kinloss, Scotland (1553–1587)

See also
 Walter Read (disambiguation) 
 Walter Reade (disambiguation) 
 Walter Reed (disambiguation)